Venky Mama is a 2019 Indian Telugu-language action comedy film directed by K. S. Ravindra. It stars Venkatesh, Naga Chaitanya, Raashii Khanna, and Payal Rajput in the lead roles, while Nassar, Prakash Raj, and Rao Ramesh play supporting roles. The film was produced by D. Suresh Babu of Suresh Productions and T. G. Vishwa Prasad of People Media Factory, with music composed by Thaman.

The film was released on 13 December 2019, coinciding with Venkatesh's birthday, to mixed reviews from critics but praise for Venkatesh's performance and ended up as a commercial success at the box office.

Plot 
The film begins at Draksharama where a well-known personality Ramanarayana, an astrologer, lives with his wife Lakshmi and son Venkatarathnam. Ramanarayana opposes his daughter's marriage, as he foresaw the couple's death, soon after, a year of their son Karthik's birth. Just like Ramanarayana predicted, Karthik loses his parents in a tragic accident. Here, Ramanarayana warns that the kid also brings bummer to his family and suggests to hand him over to his paternal grandparents. However, Venkatarathnam / Venky Mama denies it and rears his infant nephew with care and affection, even omitting his goal of enrollment in the army.

Years roll by, and now the scene shifts to Kashmir where Venkatarathnam is under the search of Karthik, who left home without informing. Immediately, Venkatarathnam steps into army protected area and get prosecuted when he tries to convince the army officers regarding Karthik. However, they affirm the absence of such a person in their regiment, but Venkatarathnam persists to meet him. So, he starts narrating their story. After completion of engineering, Karthik disdains various jobs because he prefers to stay behind his uncle. Nevertheless, his grandfather always needles. Later, Karthik realizes that Venkatarathnam has forsaken his marital life for his nurture, so he determines to get a perfect match for him. Just as, he is acquainted with newly appointed Hindi teacher Vennela and strives to develop intimacy with her, which she misunderstands. Besides, Karthik's ex-lover Harika, daughter of malicious MLA Pasupathi arrives at the village. Thereupon, Venkatarathnam learns their love affair and chases Harika to seek the reason behind their break up which too, misfires. Right now, Karthik succeeds to make Vennela fall for his uncle. Parallelly, Venkatarathnam also knows from Harika about their detachment is of Karthik's prioritization to his uncle than her and his life. Being cognizant of it, Venkatarathnam decides to disentangle with Karthik and send him to London. At that point, Karthik proclaims that nobody can divide him from his uncle, including him. Overhearing their conversation, Harika repents and understands Karthik's virtue.

Afterwards, Venkatarathnam approaches Pasupathi with the marriage proposal. At that moment, Pasupathi bids to aid Venkatarathnam in the upcoming election because his word is an ordinance to the public in the area. Anyhow, the plan back-pedals when Venkatarathnam spares and ignominies him. All at once, an enraged Pasupathi ploy to slay out Karthik when Venkatarathnam shields him. During the interval, as a flabbergast, Ramanarayana asserts that according to Karthik's horoscope, he is born to kill his maternal uncle and the only redress is to split them. Listening to it, Venkatarathnam and Karthik refuse to accept it. But unfortunately, the word befalls as several incidents which make Karthik realize and leaves the house for the protection of his uncle. After three years, Ramanarayana announces the actuality of Karthik's presence in the army to fulfill his uncle's ambition. Momentarily the story shifts to the present when Venkatarathnam ascertains that Karthik is seized as a hostage by the terrorist to stand-off for their leader who is already dead. During that plight, Venkatarathnam determines to swap as the terrorist in the know that it is a suicide mission to him. By the time of hand-off, due to Karthik's horoscope, he fires Venkatarathnam oversight him as a blackguard. At last, Karthik saves his uncle from the deathbed with his idolization confronting the horoscope. Finally, the movie ends on a happy note with uncle & nephew pairing up with their love interests with an axiom that horoscope is just a belief but love is a reality.

Cast 

 Venkatesh as Venkatarathnam Naidu / Military Naidu / Venky Mama
 Naga Chaitanya as Captain Karthik Shivaram Veeramachineni (Para SF)
 Raashii Khanna as Harika, Karthik's love interest, later turned wife
 Payal Rajput as Vennela, Venkatarathnam Naidu's wife
 Prakash Raj as Brigadier Vijay Prakash (Para SF)
 Nassar as Ramanarayana, Venkatarathnam's father
 Geetha as Lakshmi, Venkatarathnam's mother
 Rao Ramesh as MLA Pasupathi, Harika's father
 Sivannarayana as Apparao, Vennela's father
 Mamilla Shailaja Priya as Harika's mother 
 Nagineedu as Gagani, Karthik's paternal grandfather
 Indu Anand as Karthik's paternal grandmother
 Charuhasan as Astrologer Namboodri
 Raghu Babu as Advocate Happy Hanumantha Rao
 Aditya Menon as Colonel Ajay Ahuja
 Kishore as Major Anwar Sadat
 AK as Terrorist
 Parag Tyagi as Goon
 Chammak Chandra as Nukaraju 
 Hyper Aadi as Seetharam, Karthik's friend 
 Raghu Karumanchi as Raghuramaiah
 Jeeva as Cow-broker Babji
 Vidyullekha Raman as Candy, Harika's friend 
 Pooja Ramachandran as Bride
 Gundu Sudarshan as School Teacher
 Narra Srinu as Army Officer Rama Rao
 Dasari Arun Kumar as Dora Babu, Pasupathi's brother-in-law
 C. V. L. Narasimha Rao as Master 
 Master Naga Mahesh as Vennela's naughty student

Production

Development 
D. Ramanaidu, father of Venkatesh Daggubati and grandfather of Naga Chaitanya, wanted both actors to be seen together on screen, D. Suresh Babu, elder son of Ramanaidu and producer of the film said on the occasion of his father 83rd birth anniversary. So, when Suresh Babu was in search of the story, writer Janardhana Maharshi pitched a story to him which he liked and later writer and director KS Ravindra was joined to direct the film and developed of the storyline of Janardhana and he made major changes to it.

Venkatesh after multi-starrers like Seethamma Vakitlo Sirimalle Chettu with Mahesh Babu, Masala with Ram Pothineni, Gopala Gopala with Pawan Kalyan, and F2 – Fun and Frustration with Varun Tej, is doing another multi-starrer, this time with his nephew Naga Chaitanya. Before this Venkatesh did a cameo role in Chaitanya's film Premam, this is the first time they are doing a full-length role together in a film.

The film was officially launched at Ramanaidu Studios by director VV Vinayak as chief guest. It is jointly produced by People Media Factory and Suresh Productions.

Casting 
Initially, it was reported that Shriya Saran and Rakul Preet Singh were cast in the lead roles. But they were subsequently replaced by Payal Rajput and Raashi Khanna, respectively.

Filming 
Principal photography began on the banks of Godavari River on 24 February 2019,  and completed its first schedule in Rajahmundry. In March 2019, while shooting for an action sequence Venkatesh was injured and advised to take two weeks rest.

The second schedule was started in April 2019 in Hyderabad. Filming was also done in Kashmir and Visakhapatnam, and was wrapped up in August 2019.

Soundtrack

Music was composed by S. Thaman, and released on Aditya Music company.

The first song Venky Mama was released on 7 November 2019, Sung by Sri Krishna, Mohana Bhogaraju and lyrics penned by Ramajogayya Sastry, the song tells deep bond between uncle (Venkatesh) and his nephew (Chaitanya).

The second song Yennellako was released on 16 November 2019, on the occasion of the music director S. Thaman birthday, Sung by Prudhvi Chandra, S. Thaman and lyrics penned by Sri Mani.

The third song Coca Cola Pepsi mass-song was released on 4 December 2019, sung by Aditi Bhavaraju, Ramya Behara, Simha and Hanuman; its lyrics were written by Kasarla Shyam.

Release
Venky Mama was set to release on 4 October 2019, but the release was delayed until November. The film was released on 13 December 2019, on the occasion of Venkatesh's birthday.

Marketing 
In December 2019, a pre-release event was held in Khammam, later followed by a musical night event where the soundtrack album was released. K. Raghavendra Rao attended as guest.

Home media 
The film is available for streaming on Amazon Prime video since 16 January 2020. The satellite rights of the film were bagged by Gemini TV

Reception

Box office 
Venky Mama on opening day collected 16.5 crore gross worldwide. On the second day, the film collected 14 crore gross worldwide. On the third day, the film collected 14.5 crore gross worldwide and despite mixed reviews the movie's first weekend worldwide gross was 45 crore. In 11 days, the movie collected a total gross of 54.90 crore and a share of 31.99 crore worldwide.
In 13 days, the movie collected a total gross of 57.80 crore worldwide.
Up to the third week, the movie collected a total gross of 72 crore worldwide.

Critical reception 
Venky Mama was a block buster at box office but was received average reviews.

The Hans India gave 3 out of 5 stars stating "Having a solid storyline became the biggest plus point for this movie. The entire movies revolve around the beautiful relationship between Naga Chaitanya and Venkatesh and the director has executed it in an engaging way". Samayam gave 3.5 out of 5 stars stating "Venky Mama will make you laugh, cry and please".

The Times of India gave 2.5 out of 5 stars stating "Mediocre writing and crass humour let down this comic caper. The only saving grace for Venky Mama is the performance of its lead actors Venkatesh and Naga Chaitanya". India Today gave 2.5 out of 5 stars stating "Director had to include everything just to play to the gallery and make it please every age group. The result is nothing but a colossal disappointment and a wasted opportunity".

The News Minute gave 2 out of 5 stars stating "Venky Mama is a crowd-pleaser. What they call a mass entertainer. Two songs. Two comedians. Two “double-meaning” scenes, one wasted brilliant actor (Prakash Raj), one adored-as-god village head and a silly looking interview panel. Not really boring". Firstpost gave 2.5 out of 5 stars stating "This isn’t a film where one can judge how well an actor has performed when the writing and treatment leaves a lot to be desired. The film rushes through some of its major set-pieces and there’s hardly a build-up to moments where you might end up crying. The film just doesn't deliver what it sets out to achieve, and we are left to be content with bits and pieces of emotional sequences between Venkatesh and Naga Chaitanya. Venky Mama could have been so much more than what it is, but it's a missed opportunity!".

References

External links 
 

2010s Telugu-language films
Films scored by Thaman S
Films shot in Ladakh
Films shot in Hyderabad, India
2010s action comedy-drama films
Indian Air Force in films
Prisoner of war films
Indian war drama films
Films set in Jammu and Kashmir
Kashmir conflict in films
Military of Pakistan in films
Indian nonlinear narrative films
Indian Army in films
India–Pakistan relations in popular culture
2019 films
Indian action comedy-drama films
Suresh Productions films